Barry Cowan may refer to:

Barry Cowan (broadcaster) (1948–2004), journalist and broadcaster with BBC Northern Ireland
Barry Cowan (tennis) (born 1974), former British tennis player

See also
Barry Cowen (born 1967), Irish politician